The New Zealand National Hockey League, known also by the sponsored name Ford National Hockey League, was the New Zealand's national field hockey championship.

The competition features players from New Zealand's national hockey teams, the Black Sticks Men and Women.

The most recent champions are North Harbour in the men's tournament, and North Harbour in the women's.

History
The first season of both the men's and women's Ford National Hockey League took place in 2000, and has been held annually since. The most successful team in both the men's and women's competition is Auckland, with both teams having won 5 titles apiece.

2019 will mark the end of the Ford NHL, with Hockey New Zealand restructuring the tournament into the Premier Hockey League in 2020.

Men's tournament

Men's Teams
The following are the men's teams at the 2019 National Hockey League:

 Auckland
 Canterbury
 Capital
 Central
 Midlands
 Northland
 North Harbour
 Southern
 Tasmania

Men's Results Summaries
Note: the following summary comprises results from 2012 onwards, while the tournament was founded in 1999:

Women's tournament

Women's Teams
The following are the women's teams at the 2017 National Hockey League:

 Auckland
 Canterbury
 Capital
 Central
 Midlands
 Northland
 North Harbour
 Southern

Women's Results Summaries
Note: the following summary comprises results from 2008 onwards, while the tournament was founded in 1999:

Women's team performances

See also
New Zealand Hockey Federation
International Hockey Federation
hockeynz.altiusrt.com

References

External links

Field hockey competitions in New Zealand
Professional sports leagues in New Zealand
Field hockey leagues in Oceania
Sports leagues established in 2000
Sports leagues disestablished in 2019
2000 establishments in New Zealand
2019 disestablishments in New Zealand